Robinsons Galleria Cebu, also known and branded as Galleria Cebu, is a shopping mall and mixed-use development located in North Reclamation Area, Cebu City. It is the 2nd Robinsons Mall to bear the Galleria branding after Robinsons Galleria. The mall opened on December 10, 2015. The mall is owned and operated by Robinsons Malls. It is the firm's third largest mall (after Robinsons Place Manila and its namesake, Robinsons Galleria, in Ortigas, Metro Manila).

History
In 2008, Robinsons Land, Inc. announced that they have bought a  prime property near the Port of Cebu. The company bared that they planned to build a mall, a three-storey BPO tower, a 153-room Go Hotel (which would have been the first in Cebu),  of office space and a couple of high-rise condominiums. The development was initially called Robinsons Maxilom, named after General Maxilom Avenue, the road it directly borders to. The project was then renamed to its current name a couple of years later. The project broke ground in July 2012 and construction followed soon. The mall opened on December 10, 2015, exactly two weeks after another mall, SM Seaside City Cebu by rival group SM Supermalls opened.

Mall features
There will be six cinemas in the mall. The mall also has an al fresco dining area and the mall's interiors feature lush gardens. When the whole development is finished, it will have a 153-room hotel named Summit Galleria Hotel, BPO towers, and three high-rise condominiums (which will be located at the back of the mall).

References

External links

 

Robinsons Malls
Shopping malls in Cebu City
Shopping malls established in 2015